Campus Party is the second and final studio album by the American rock band the Rivieras released in 1965 through Riviera Records. This album continued the band's "frat rock" sound, and contains many popular cover songs done in this style. This album, as well as the previous, were compiled on the 2000 greatest hits release, California Sun: The Best of the Rivieras. Previously, tracks from Campus Party were available on the Star-Club Records compilation, also titled Let's Have A Party.

Background
Unlike the band's previous album, Campus Party did not receive wide distribution from U.S.A. Records, and there's estimated to have been about 1000 copies pressed, making it extremely scarce. No singles were put out in promotion of the album, however the track "Bug Juice" appears as a B-side to the single "Never Feel The Pain", released in 1964. Campus Party introduces Jeff McKew on rhythm guitar and Terry McCoy on drums, replacing Willie Gaut and Paul Dennert, respectively. This album would be the band's final studio effort, as the band folded the following year due to the changing music atmosphere and personal issues.

Among the covers on the album, "California Sun '65" is a remake of the band's biggest hit, "California Sun" with new lyrics. The album closes with a medley of "Louie Louie" and "Farmer John", the former being popularized by the Kingsmen. "Somebody New" (backed by a non-LP track, "Somebody Asked Me") was released in September 1965 as a single from the album.

Track listing

Personnel
 Bill Dobslaw —  lead vocals, management, producer
 Jim Boal —  lead guitar
 Otto Nuss —  organ and piano
 Doug Gean —  bass guitar
 Jeff McKew —  rhythm guitar, vocals
 Terry McCoy —  drums

References

Rock-and-roll albums
1965 albums